Doughboy is a former nickname for an American infantryman, especially one from World War I.

Dough boy, Doughboy, Doughboys, etc. may also refer to:

Places

Australia 

 Doughboy, Queensland, a locality in the Bundaberg Region
 Doughboy River, a river in Mapoon, Queensland, Australia
Hemmant, Queensland, Australia, historically called Doughboy Creek
The Doughboys (Tasmania), a pair of islands off Cape Grim, Tasmania

New Zealand 

 Doughboy Bay, a bay on the western side of Stewart Island / Rakiura, New Zealand

United States 

 Doughboy, Nebraska, a community in the United States
 Doughboy Park, a public park in Queens, New York City, United States

Other 

Doughboy Island (disambiguation), any of several islands worldwide

Arts, entertainment, and media

Characters
 Pillsbury Doughboy, a character in advertisements for the Pillsbury Company
 Doughboy (comics), a fictional character in the Marvel Universe
 Darrin "Doughboy" Baker, the name of Ice Cube's character in the 1991 film Boyz n the Hood

Films
 Doughboys (film), a 1930 film starring Buster Keaton
 Dough Boys, a 2008 film directed by Louis Lombardi
 Dough Boys (film), a 2009 film

Music
 Doughboy (record producer) (born 1989), American hip hop producer
 Doughboys (Canadian band), 1980s-90s Canadian alternative rock band
 The Doughboys (American band), an American rock band from Plainfield

Other uses in arts, entertainment, and media
 The Doughboy (Ivone), a sculpture by Arthur Ivone outside the statehouse in Columbus, Ohio, US
 Dough Boy (video game), originally released in 1984 for the Commodore 64
 Doughboys (podcast), a fast-food review comedy podcast part of HeadGum Podcast Network

Military
 Doughboy Award, an American military honor
 Doughboy helmet or Brodie helmet, used by British and American troops in World War I

Other uses
 Fried dough, also known as "doughboys", a deep-fried yeast dough snack, often sweet, associated with outdoor food stands such as carnivals

See also

 Philippe "Dough Man" Dauman (born 1954) U.S. businessman
 Doughboy Island (disambiguation)
 Doe Boy (disambiguation)